Edward Royle (born 29 March 1944) is a British academic who is Emeritus Professor of History at the University of York and author of several books on the history of religious ideas, particularly in York and Yorkshire.

Career
Royle gained his PhD at the  University of Cambridge. He spent the majority of his career in the Department of History at the University of York, where he retired as an emeritus professor. He is an active member of the University's Centre for Eighteenth-Century Studies. His main research interests have been in the history of York and Yorkshire since the mid-eighteenth century. 

Professor Royle is a local Methodist Preacher.

Works

(as editor) 

(with James Walvin) 

(editor, with Ruth M. Larsen)

References

1944 births
Living people
British historians
Academics of the University of York
Alumni of the University of Cambridge
British Methodists